Ranjan Gupta (born 11 December 1980) is an Indian former cricketer. He played first-class cricket for Delhi and Haryana between 2000 and 2005.

See also
 List of Delhi cricketers

References

External links
 

1980 births
Living people
Indian cricketers
Delhi cricketers
Haryana cricketers
Cricketers from Delhi